The Cathedral of Solsona is a cathedral in Solsona, Catalonia, Spain. The apse, in Roman style, probably dates from the twelfth century.

References

 Monestirs de Catalunya. Catedral de Solsona

12th-century Roman Catholic church buildings in Spain
Roman Catholic cathedrals in Catalonia